Emmochliophis miops  is a species of snake of the family Colubridae. The species is found in Ecuador and Colombia.

References

Emmochliophis
Reptiles of Colombia
Reptiles of Ecuador
Reptiles described in 1898
Taxa named by George Albert Boulenger